Tom Thumb's Picture Alphabet is an illustrated picture book for children published in 1850s.

Publication

Published at Clinton Hall in New York in the 1850s, Tom Thumb's Picture Alphabet is an illustrated chapbook consisting of a rhyming English alphabet; considered part of the New England Primer. It was the first book in the first of the "Redfield's Toy Books" series, a four-part series of 48 children's books. The selling price for Tom Thumb's Picture Alphabet was 1 cent. The woodcut engravings, designed by J. G. Chapman, were considered plain and simple illustrations. It also features an advertisement for other J. S. Redfield publications for toy books, school books, and medical books.

It was advertised in many publications, including The consumptive's guide to health, Americans warned of Jesuitism, and others.

Tom Thumb's Picture Alphabet is considered one of several schoolbooks of the early 19th century in competition, during a period where there was a great expansion of educational books for children made available. A review from the School Library Journal is mixed, saying that while some of the book provided "a tidy sentence for each letter," other words used in the rhyme schemes would either be unfamiliar to many children, or they would "stretch to rhyme."

Reprints and derivatives
Tom Thumb's Picture Alphabet has been republished and reprinted many times, by publisher's such as Kiggins and Kellogg.  A version published by Scholastic in 2002 includes new illustrations by Tiphanie Beeke, which appears in Treasury Of Alphabets.

References

Sources

External links

Children Learning Reading

1850s children's books
American picture books
Alphabet books
Chapbooks